The Battle of Darbar Sahib was fought between the Shaheedan Misl of the Sikhs and the Durrani Empire of Ahmad Shah Abdali aided by the Khanate of Kalat.

Battle 

During the year 1764, the Sikh Misls greatly expanded their territory over the region of Punjab, including other North Indian regions. This greatly weakened Durrani rule over Punjab which forced Ahmad Shah Abdali to launch a 7th invasion into India.

Ahmad Shah Abdali including his army reached Eminabad where his Baloch ally Nasir Khan joined him. The Afghans had a force of 18,000 and the Baloch had a force of 12,000, having a total force of 30,000. Soon they got into a skirmish against Charat Singh's Sukerchakia Misl.

The Sikhs later retreated to Amritsar. When Ahmad heard this, he immediately marched towards Amritsar. Baba Gurbaksh Singh learnt about this,he along with Man Singh,Basant Singh,Nihal Singh along with 26 other Sikhs decided to defend their holy city of Amritsar.

They finally fought at Shri Harmandir Sahib (also known as Darbar Sahib or Golden Temple) which is the holiest site of Sikhism, and fought until there was nothing but pieces left of the 30 Sikhs.

References

See also 

 Nihang
 Martyrdom and Sikhism

Battles involving the Sikhs
Battles of the Early Modern period